In geometry, the biaugmented pentagonal prism is one of the Johnson solids. As the name suggests, it can be constructed by doubly augmenting a pentagonal prism by attaching square pyramids to two of its nonadjacent equatorial faces. (The solid obtained by attaching pyramids to adjacent equatorial faces is not convex, and thus not a Johnson solid.)

External links
 
 

Johnson solids